The University of Alabama Observatory is an astronomical observatory owned and operated by the University of Alabama in Tuscaloosa, Alabama.  The new domed observatory was built atop Gallalee Hall, completed in 1949.  It replaced the Old Observatory, which had been in use from 1849 until the 1890s.  Initially equipped with a  refracting telescope, this was the university's primary telescope from 1950 until 2004. The old telescope was removed and then sold to an antique telescope collector to make way for the new instrument.  A new  Ritchey-Chrétien reflector, manufactured by DFM Engineering, was installed in 2005.

See also
Old University of Alabama Observatory
List of observatories

References 

Astronomical observatories in Alabama
University of Alabama
Buildings and structures in Tuscaloosa, Alabama
Tourist attractions in Tuscaloosa, Alabama